The Coalition of the Youth of the Revolution was a coalition of organisations of young people involved in the Egyptian Revolution of 2011. The group disbanded on 7 July 2012 after Egypt's transitional period had ended.

Members
Members included:
 The April 6 Youth Movement
 A youth organisation of the Muslim Brotherhood 
 Supporters of Mohamed ElBaradei, a leading figure of the opposition movement,

Activity
The group organized post-revolution events of the 2011 Egyptian revolution and met with the Supreme Council of the Armed Forces to negotiate demands including the resignation of the Minister of Interior, the restoration of a fair minimum wage, the end of Emergency Law and term limits for the president.

External links

 Coalition of Youth Revolution on Facebook

References

2011 establishments in Egypt
Egyptian democracy movements
Egyptian revolution of 2011
Organizations of the Arab Spring
Organisations of the Egyptian Crisis (2011–2014)
Political opposition organizations